Stanisław Czuryło (died 1661) was a Roman Catholic prelate who served as Auxiliary Bishop of Lutsk (1659–1661)

Biography
On 22 Sep 1659, Stanisław Czuryło was appointed during the papacy of Pope Alexander VII as Auxiliary Bishop of Lutsk and Titular Bishop of Orthosias in Caria. He served as Auxiliary Bishop of Lutsk until his death in 1661.

References

External links and additional sources
 (for Chronology of Bishops) 
 (for Chronology of Bishops)  

17th-century Roman Catholic bishops in the Polish–Lithuanian Commonwealth
Bishops appointed by Pope Alexander VII
1661 deaths